Children of the Corn was an American hip-hop group formed in 1993, consisting of neighborhood friends and fellow Harlem rappers Big L, Cam'ron, Ma$e, Herb McGruff, and Bloodshed. The group's name is a play on words; it is short for Children of the Corner, and also references Stephen King's 1984 film of the same name.

History
Big L was the founder of the group, as he pushed Mase and Cam'ron off the streets and into the studio, as well as Bloodshed, who was Cam'ron's cousin, with the last member of the group being Herb McGruff. They released over 30 songs under the name Children of the Corn, as they tried for a record deal. They got paid any way they could, rhyming for local DJs and selling mixtapes out of their trunks.

The group disbanded after the death of Bloodshed in a car crash on March 2, 1997 at age 21 and the murder of Big L on February 15, 1999 at age 24. Even before the group disbanded, each of the group members had pursued their solo careers. Big L started his own record label Flamboyant Entertainment, Ma$e with Bad Boy, Cam'ron with Epic and McGruff with Uptown. A collection of the group's songs, entitled Children of the Corn: The Collector's Edition was released in 2003.

Notes and references 

African-American musical groups
Hip hop collectives
Hip hop groups from New York City
Horrorcore groups
Musical groups established in 1993
Musical groups disestablished in 1999
Underground hip hop groups